The 2003 National Hurling League was the 72nd seasons of the National Hurling League.

Division 1

Kilkenny came into the season as defending champions of the 2002 season. Laois entered Division 1 as the promoted team.

On 5 May 2003, Kilkenny won the title following a 5–14 to 5–13 win over Tipperary in the final. It was their second league title in succession and their 11th National League title overall.

Derry, who lost all of their group stage matches, were relegated from Division 1 after losing all of their matches in the relegation group. Antrim won Division 2 and secured promotion to the top tier.

Tipperary's Eoin Kelly was the Division 1 top scorer with 6-56.

Division 1A table

Group stage

Division 1B table

Group stage

Group 1 table

Group stage

Group 2 table

Group stage

Knock-out stage

Final

Scoring statistics

Top scorers overall

Top scorers in a single game

Division 2

Division 2A table

Division 2B table

Group 1 table

Group 2 table

Knock-out stage

Division 3

Division 3A table

Division 3B table

Group 1 table

Group 2 table

Knock-out stage

Final

References

League
National Hurling League seasons